Abay (اباي اۋدانى) is a district of Abai Region in eastern Kazakhstan. The administrative center of the district is the selo of Karaul. Population:

References

Districts of Kazakhstan
East Kazakhstan Region